Epiphthora niphaula is a moth of the family Gelechiidae. It was described by Edward Meyrick in 1904. It is found in Australia, where it has been recorded from Tasmania.

The forewings are brownish ochreous mixed with white and with a moderately broad silvery-white costal streak from the base to the apex. There is a cloudy undefined white streak along the submedian fold from the base to the tornus. The hindwings are grey whitish.

References

Moths described in 1904
Epiphthora
Taxa named by Edward Meyrick